Elections to the French National Assembly were held in Réunion on 30 September 1849 as part of the wider French elections, with a second round on 21 October. The territory elected two seats, with voters able to cast two votes. The seats were won by Charles Ogé Barbaroux and Jean-Baptiste de Greslan.

Results

References

Reunion
Elections in Réunion
1849 in Réunion